The men's 50 metre freestyle competition of the swimming events at the 2012 European Aquatics Championships took place May 26 and 27. The heats and semifinals took place on May 26, the final on May 27.

Records
Prior to the competition, the existing world, European and championship records were as follows.

Results

Heats
53 swimmers participated in 7 heats.

Semifinals
The eight fasters swimmers advanced to the final.

Semifinal 1

Semifinal 2

Final
The final was held at 17:05.

References

Men's 50 m freestyle